The 1995–96 Tigres UANL season is the 36th season in the football club's history and the 29th consecutive season in the top flight of Mexican football.

Summary
In summertime, Manuel Silos in his 4th year as Dean of the University of Nuevo Leon appointed sports agent Guillermo Lara as new club President in a desperate effort to rescue the team from its first relegation ever. Thanks to Lara, two times (1991-92 and 1993-94)  league Champion manager Victor Manuel Vucetich was appointed as new head coach after being discarded by Silos in 1993. Also, Lara reinforced the squad with several transfers in: Goalkeepers Robert Dante Siboldi (Puebla) and Miguel de Jesús Fuentes (Atlas), Defenders Alfredo Murguía (León), Marcos Ayala (Toluca), Arnulfo Tinoco (Toluca) and Francisco Gómez (Morelia), Midfielders Omar Arellano (Chivas) and José Manuel “Chepo” De la Torre (Chivas) and Argentine Forward Martin Felix Ubaldi (Atlas). However, the club had four failed bids: Juan Carlos Chávez (Atlas), Osmar Donizete (Tecos), Eric Wynalda and Ivo Basay all of them explicit petitions by manager Vucetich. On 1 February 1996 Manuel Silos resigned his post as University Dean following allegations of massive corruption during his tenure, also being the last day of Guillermo Lara as Chairman, then, Reyes Tamez was appointed as interim President until June 1996.

In spite of the squad clinches 1995-96 Copa Mexico Final against heavily favourites Atlas FC -its first cup trophy since 1976- on 24 March 1996 the club was relegated to 1996-97 Primera División A season for the first since 1974 after lost the match against its archrival CF Monterrey on round 32 with 5 points below Atlético Morelia over the relegation table.

Squad

Transfers

Winter

Competitions

La Liga

League table

Group 1

Results by round

Relegation table

Matches

Repechaje

Quarterfinals

Copa Mexico

Semifinals

Final

Statistics

Players statistics

References

External links

Tigres UANL seasons
Football in Mexico